The New York Mountains are a small mountain range found in northeastern San Bernardino County in California, USA. The range's northeastern area lies in southeastern Nevada. The range lies just south of the small community of Ivanpah, and north of the Lanfair Valley. The mountains are part of the mountain ranges, cones, mountains, and landforms in the Mojave National Preserve.

The New York Mountains are part of the southeast border of the Great Basin Divide. The Piute Wash Watershed empties eastward into the Colorado River.

Description
Searchlight, Nevada and Cal-Nev-Ari, Nevada lie to the northeast and east, respectively, across the Piute Valley. The Castle Mountains lie to the southeast with the Piute Range adjacent to the southeast.

The northeast flowing Ivanpah Valley drains the northwest side of the New York Mountains with the Ivanpah Mountains across the valley to the northwest. The McCullough Range of Nevada lies adjacent to the north.

See also

Mojave National Preserve

References

External links
New York Mountains, Peakbagger
Crescent Peak, northeast (coord)
Castle Peaks subregion, summitpost. (coord, 35.36989-N, 115.16176-W) (1712.06m)
Piute Wash Watershed, EPA, Nevada to California

Mountain ranges of the Mojave Desert
Mojave National Preserve
Mountain ranges of San Bernardino County, California
Mountain ranges of Clark County, Nevada
Mountain ranges of Southern California
Mountain ranges of Nevada
Mountain ranges of the Lower Colorado River Valley